Chris Kotsopoulos (born November 27, 1958) is a Canadian former professional ice hockey player who played 479 games in the National Hockey League. He played for the New York Rangers, Hartford Whalers, Toronto Maple Leafs, and Detroit Red Wings. As a youth, he played in the 1971 Quebec International Pee-Wee Hockey Tournament with a minor ice hockey team from Toronto.

He is the former Quinnipiac Bobcats men's ice hockey analyst on AM1220 WQUN.

Career statistics

References

External links

Profile at hockey-reference.com
http://www.chriskotsopoulos.com
https://web.archive.org/web/20120613221629/http://www.thehockeynews.com/articles/37240-Getting-To-Know-Chris-Kotsopoulos.html

1958 births
Living people
Adirondack Red Wings players
Canadian ice hockey defencemen
Canadian people of Greek descent 
Detroit Red Wings players
Hartford Whalers players
New Haven Nighthawks players
New York Rangers players
Quinnipiac University people
Sportspeople from Scarborough, Toronto
Ice hockey people from Toronto
Toronto Maple Leafs players
Undrafted National Hockey League players
Windsor Spitfires players